The 2006 Sault Ste. Marie municipal election was held on 13 November 2006 in Sault Ste. Marie, Ontario to elect a mayor and 12 city councillors to Sault Ste. Marie City Council for the term from 2006 to 2010, as well as school board trustees for the Algoma District School Board, wards 1, 3 and 4/5, and the Huron-Superior Catholic District School Board.

This election coincided with the 2006 Ontario municipal elections held across Ontario.

Mayor

Ward 1 Councillors

Ward 2 Councillors

Ward 3 Councillors

Ward 4 Councillors

Ward 5 Councillors

Ward 6 Councillors

Algoma District School Board Trustees

Huron-Superior Catholic District School Board Trustees

Conseil scolaire public du Grand Nord de l'Ontario

Conseil Scolaire de District Catholique du Nouvel Ontario

References
Results taken from the City of Sault Ste. Marie page on the 2006 Election results.

2006 Ontario municipal elections
Municipal government of Sault Ste. Marie, Ontario